Talent is a city in Jackson County, Oregon, United States. The population was 6,282 at the 2020 census.

History
A. P. Tallent, an East Tennessee native who settled in Oregon in the 1870s, platted the city in the 1880s. He wanted to name it Wagner but was overruled by postal officials, who preferred Talent, dropping one of the L's. The post office opened at this location in 1883. Earlier names for the settlement were Eden District and Wagner Creek.

2020 fire
On September 8, 2020, roughly a third of Talent, along with neighboring Phoenix and parts of Medford and Ashland, were destroyed by the Almeda Drive Fire. On September 11, 2020, authorities said they were preparing for a mass fatality incident. As of September 11, 600 homes and 100 commercial buildings have been destroyed by the Almeda Drive Fire, but on September 18, that number was updated to 2,800.  Officials stated that the Almeda Drive Fire was human-caused. On September 11, a man was arrested for arson, for allegedly starting a fire that destroyed multiple homes in Phoenix and merged with the Almeda Drive Fire. A separate criminal investigation into the origin point of the Almeda Drive Fire in Ashland is ongoing.

Geography

The city is south of Medford, about halfway between Phoenix, to the north, and Ashland, to the south, along Interstate 5 and Oregon Route 99. This is toward the southern end of the Rogue River Valley, near the Siskiyou Mountains and the border with California.

Wagner Creek, a tributary of Bear Creek, joins the larger stream at Talent. Wagner was the name of a family of pioneer settlers who lived here before Talent became a city. The Bear Creek Greenway, a biking and hiking trail connecting Ashland, Phoenix, Medford, and Central Point along Bear Creek, also passes through Talent.

Climate
This region experiences warm to hot and dry summers, with average temperatures above . According to the Köppen Climate Classification system, Talent has a warm-summer Mediterranean climate, abbreviated "Csb" on climate maps.

Demographics

2010 census
As of the census of 2010, there were 6,066 people, 2,639 households, and 1,462 families living in the city. The racial makeup of the city was 87.0% White, 0.8% African American, 1.3% Native American, 0.9% Asian, 0.2% Pacific Islander, 5.9% from other races, and 3.9% from two or more races. Hispanic or Latino of any race were 15.6% of the population.

There were 2,639 households, of which 30.1% had children under the age of 18 living with them, 36.9% were married couples living together, 13.3% had a female householder with no husband present, 5.2% had a male householder with no wife present, and 44.6% were non-families. 33.5% of all households were made up of individuals, and 14.4% had someone living alone who was 65 years of age or older. The average household size was 2.29 and the average family size was 2.96.

The median age in the city was 38.4 years. 24% of residents were under the age of 18; 8.4% were between the ages of 18 and 24; 26.4% were from 25 to 44; 24.9% were from 45 to 64; and 16.3% were 65 years of age or older. The gender makeup of the city was 46.6% male and 53.4% female.

2000 census
As of the census of 2000, there were 5,589 people, 2,324 households, and 1,426 families living in the city. The population density was 4,433.6 people per square mile (1,712.6/km). There were 2,420 housing units at an average density of 1,919.7 per square mile (741.6/km). The racial makeup of the city was 87.30% White, 0.54% African American, 1.06% Native American, 0.36% Asian, 0.11% Pacific Islander, 7.91% from other races, and 2.74% from two or more races. Hispanic or Latino of any race were 12.40% of the population.

There were 2,324 households, out of which 30.7% had children under the age of 18 living with them, 43.9% were married couples living together, 13.4% had a female householder with no husband present, and 38.6% were non-families. 29.1% of all households were made up of individuals, and 14.3% had someone living alone who was 65 years of age or older. The average household size was 2.39 and the average family size was 2.95.

In the city, the population was 26.0% under the age of 18, 11.2% from 18 to 24, 27.3% from 25 to 44, 18.5% from 45 to 64, and 17.0% who were 65 years of age or older. The median age was 34 years. For every 100 females, there were 89.6 males. For every 100 females age 18 and over, there were 85.5 males.

The median income for a household in the city was $29,063, and the median income for a family was $33,333. Males had a median income of $24,781 versus $21,213 for females. The per capita income for the city was $16,271. About 12.4% of families and 15.4% of the population were below the poverty line, including 21.3% of those under age 18 and 8.4% of those age 65 or over.

Education
Talent Elementary School and Talent Middle School are part of the Phoenix-Talent School District. High school students attend Phoenix High School in Phoenix. Phoenix-Talent Rising Academy is a virtual hybrid school in Phoenix.

Notable people
 Robert Arellano (1969– ), author and professor
 John Beeson (1803–1889), abolitionist and Native American advocate

References

External links

 
 Entry for Talent in the Oregon Blue Book
 

 
Cities in Oregon
Cities in Jackson County, Oregon
1910 establishments in Oregon
Populated places established in 1910